William Harold Ade (March 22, 1912 – June 19, 1988) was an American cyclist who competed in the 1932 Summer Olympics.

Harold was an athlete on the Olympic Cycling 4000m Team Pursuit, and was joined by Ruggero Berti, also from the East Coast, as well as Eddie Testa and Russell Allen from California. 
The four members had only two weeks of daily training to prepare together for the 1932 Summer Games and continued training as the events commenced.

After his athletics career, Ade became a firefighter and was later appointed the deputy chief of the Oak Park Township, Illinois fire department.

References

1912 births
1988 deaths
American male cyclists
Olympic cyclists of the United States
Cyclists from California
Cyclists at the 1932 Summer Olympics
People from La Mesa, California